Thomas Gabriel  is an American singer and songwriter and is the eldest grandchild of singer and actor Johnny Cash. Gabriel's music has been described as a mix of Americana/Roots with a hint of country and rock.

Biography
Gabriel  was born in 1973 in Ventura, California, to Kathy Cash and Thomas Coggins. Kathy Cash is one of four daughters Johnny Cash had with first wife Vivian Liberto Cash. Kathy was just 16 years old when Thomas was born.

He spent time touring with grandparents Johnny Cash and June Carter Cash as a boy and became interested in music at an early age, taking up guitar at age 11. In addition to following in his family’s musical footsteps, Gabriel also followed down the path of substance abuse that has plagued the Cash and Carter families.  He began drinking at age 13.

Despite Gabriel's interest in music, his grandfather, Johnny Cash, steered him away from show business and into law enforcement. Gabriel served as a police officer for eight years before drinking and drug abuse caused him to resign. His addictions led to a lengthy arrest record, and a number of years in prison.

While in prison, Gabriel once again turned his attention to music. After his release, he continued work on musical projects he had started behind bars but struggled to stay sober.

When producer Brian Oxley (who had recently purchased Johnny Cash’s farm  in Tennessee and had taken an interest in the Cash family) came along, he persuaded Gabriel to make his 22nd attempt at entering rehab. After a year in rehab, Gabriel began work with Oxley on his first independent album, Long Way Home, released in 2018.

Musical career

Long Way Home
Gabriel released his debut album in 2018. The 11-track album included:

 "Everything Must Be Sold"
 "1974"
 "Cell"
 "Instant Release"
 "Get on Home"
 "Slipping Away"
 "Come to Me"
 "Always Is Forever"
 "Twangtown"
 "Never Going Back Down"
 "Long Way Home"

Reviews for the album praised its combination of dark, progressive music with blues, gospel, and rock n' roll.

Folsom Prison performance
In October 2018, 50 years after his grandfather's legendary live performance at Folsom State Prison in California, Gabriel and his guitarist Derek Toa performed two shows for prison inmates.

The singer performed a mix of his own music along with some of Johnny Cash's classic hits.

"Right Side of the Dirt"
Gabriel released the single "Right Side of the Dirt" in April 2020.

The singer called the song a reflection on how much his life has improved from the time when waking up in the morning was the worst part of his day.

References 

1973 births
Living people
Americana musicians
Cash–Carter family
American male singer-songwriters
American people of English descent
American people of Scottish descent
Musicians from Nashville, Tennessee
American country singer-songwriters
Musicians from Ventura County, California
American country rock musicians
Singer-songwriters from California
Singer-songwriters from Tennessee